The 2019–20 season was Real Zaragoza's sixth consecutive season in the Segunda División and their 88th year in existence. Along with Segunda División, the club competed in the Copa del Rey. The season was due to cover a period from 1 July 2019 to 30 June 2020. It was extended extraordinarily beyond 30 June due to the COVID-19 pandemic in Spain.

Players

Current squad

Out on loan

Pre-season and friendlies

Real Zaragoza announced six pre-season friendlies against Peña Ferranca, Club Deportivo Ebro, Calahorra, Gimnàstic de Tarragona, Deportivo Alavés, and Tudelano.

Competitions

Overview

Segunda División

League table

Results summary

Results by round

Matches
The fixtures were revealed on 4 July 2019.

Play-offs

Copa del Rey

Statistics

Appearances and goals
Last updated on 17 March 2020.

|-
! colspan=10 style=background:#dcdcdc; text-align:center|Goalkeepers

|-
! colspan=10 style=background:#dcdcdc; text-align:center|Defenders

|-
! colspan=14 style=background:#dcdcdc; text-align:center|Midfielders

|-
! colspan=14 style=background:#dcdcdc; text-align:center|Forwards

|-
! colspan=14 style=background:#dcdcdc; text-align:center| Players who have made an appearance or had a squad number this season but have left the club

|}

Goals

Clean sheets

References

External links

Real Zaragoza seasons
Real Zaragoza